Karuvathoor Sree Ramaswamy Temple is a Hindu temple located at Kurumaldesam in the Velur panchayat of Thrissur district in the state of Kerala, India. This temple is located close to the Kurumal Sree Bhagawati Temple. Both temples function under the Cochin Devaswom Board. Karuvathur temple is about 3 km from the Vengilassery Manimalarkavu temple where the Maru Marakkal Struggle took place and also Kumbha Bharani - Kuthira Vela is celebrated and the Kururamma Temple associated with the story of Lord Krishna. Renovation work is underway at the Karuvathoor temple.

History 
Azhavanchery Thamprakkal is the pioneer of the Azhavanchery Mana, who holds an important place in the history of Kerala and once held a high spiritual status in the Kerala Hindu community. Karuvathoor Sree Ramaswamy Temple is a temple consecrated by Alzhavancheri Thamprakkal who had the last word on the rituals of the temples in Kerala.

Although the exact history of the temple is not yet known, it is believed to be over a thousand years old. Initially owned by the Azhvancheri Mana, the temple was later handed over to the Avanaparambu Mana of Kiralur desam. Even when Avanaparambu Mana was shifted to Kumbalangad, the ownership of the temple remained with them. Later, when the government of Kerala brought the temples under the control of several Devaswom Boards under a special law, the Karuvathoor Temple came under the control of the Cochin Devaswom Board. The Karuvathoor Temple is currently functioning under the Nelluvai Mullakkal Devaswom under the Thiruvilvamala Group of the Cochin Devaswom Board. Information about the Azhvanchery Thamprakkal and Avanaparambu Mana is available in Aithihyamala written by Kottarathil Shankunni.

Legend 
According to Hindu mythology, Lord Rama is the seventh incarnation of Lord Vishnu. Hindus believe that Lord Vishnu incarnated as Lord Rama with the aim of restoring Dharma through the slaying of demonic forces. The story of Lord Rama is world famous through the epic poem Ramayana by the sage Valmiki. The Karuvathur Sri Ramaswamy Temple is dedicated to Lord Rama, who ascended to the throne after defeating all the demonic forces.

Temple design 
The Karuvathoor Temple is housed in a rectangular shrine with a dome and a tiled roof. The sculptural art used here is entirely Kerala. The sanctum sanctorum of the temple faces east. The sopanam (stairs) leads directly east from the sanctum sanctorum. In front of the sanctum sanctorum, there is a Namaskara Mandapam (small hall) and a Pradakshina Vazhi (path) around the sanctum sanctorum with idols of the deities Ganapati and Ayyappa. Balikkals (Divine Granite Stones) of the Ashtadikpalakas (Guardians of Directions) from Indra to Ishana and Saptamathas can be seen around.

The temple well is located on the north east side and Thidappalli (Kitchen) on the south east side. The main entrance of the temple has Valiyampalam (hall for delivering spiritual discourses and chanting of mantras) on both sides. Vilakkumadams have been built inside and outside of the temple. There are Pradakshina Vazhi, Deepa Sthampam, large and small Balikkals outside the Nalambalam. To the north-west are the Naga deities and the temple pool.

Pictures

References 

Hindu temples in Kerala